''Phymorhynchus'' n. sp. “SWIR” is a species of as-yet-undescribed (as of 2016) sea snail, a marine gastropod mollusk in the family Raphitomidae.

Distribution
This species is known only from Longqi vent field in Southwest Indian Ridge.

Description

References

External links

Phymorhynchus
Undescribed gastropod species